{{Speciesbox
| image = Phyllonorycter trifasciella, Marl Hall Woods, North Wales, Sept 2009 (20177798365).jpg
| image_caption = Phyllonorycter trifasciella, Marl Hall Woods, Llandudno Junction, North Wales, Sept 2009 
| image2 = PHYLLONORYCTER trifasciella.JPG
| taxon = Phyllonorycter trifasciella| authority =  Haworth, 1828
| synonyms =
}}Phyllonorycter trifasciella is a moth of the family Gracillariidae. It is found in Western Europe.

The wingspan is 7–8 mm. The forewings are pale reddish ochreous; three slender whitish more or less angulated fasciae, margined anteriorly with broad blackish suffusions, broadest towards costa, third sometimes interrupted by a patch of blackish scales extending to tornus; a round blackish apical spot. Hindwings are grey.

The moth flies in three generations, from March–April, July–August and October.

The larvae feed on Lonicera, Symphoricarpos and Leycesteria'' species.

References

External links
 Microlepidoptera.nl  
 Lepidoptera of Belgium
 Plant Parasites of Europe
 Phyllonorycter trifasciella at UKmoths

trifasciella
Moths described in 1828
Moths of Europe
Taxa named by Adrian Hardy Haworth